Frederico José Carlos Themudo "Fritz" d'Orey (25 March 1938 – 31 August 2020) was a Brazilian racing driver of German and Portuguese descent. He participated in three Formula One World Championship Grands Prix, debuting on 5 July 1959. He scored no championship points.

Complete Formula One World Championship results
(key)

References

External links
 Profile at ESPN F1
 Profile at grandprix.com

1938 births
2020 deaths
Brazilian racing drivers
Brazilian Formula One drivers
Scuderia Centro Sud Formula One drivers
Camoradi Formula One drivers
Tec-Mec Formula One drivers
World Sportscar Championship drivers
Racing drivers from São Paulo